Post Ekspres Prima is an airline based in Jakarta, Indonesia. It operates passenger services and its main base is Halim Perdanakusuma International Airport, Jakarta.

History 

The airline was established and started operations in 1992 as Rajawali Air.

Fleet 

As of March 2007 the Post Express Prima fleet includes:
1 Grumman Gulfstream I

Previously operated
In August 2006 the airline also operated:
1 Fokker F28-1000

See also

References 

Airlines of Indonesia
Airlines established in 1992
Indonesian companies established in 1992